Skull and Crown is a 1935 American Western film directed by Elmer Clifton. It was the final film of cast member Molly O'Day.

Cast 
Rin Tin Tin, Jr. as Rinty
Regis Toomey as Bob Franklin posing as Rocky Morgan
Jack Mulhall as Border Patrolman Ed
Molly O'Day as Ann Norton
Jack Mower as King / El Zorro
Lois January as Barbara Franklin
James Murray as Henchman Matt Brent
John Elliott as John Norton
Tom London as Henchman Jennings
Milburn Morante as Dad Miller

Production
The serial was filmed partly on location in Big Bear. The Big Bear footage was shot over the course of a week in October, 1934.

References

External links 

1935 films
1935 Western (genre) films
1930s romance films
1930s action films
1935 adventure films
1930s English-language films
Films directed by Elmer Clifton
Films shot in California
American black-and-white films
American Western (genre) films
Reliable Pictures films
Rin Tin Tin
1930s American films